The Supreme Court of Somaliland (SCS) is the highest court under the Constitution of Somaliland. The Court holds the power of judicial review, the ability to invalidate a statute for violating a provision of the Constitution. it has ultimate and extensive appellate, original, and advisory jurisdictions on all courts (including the district court and regional court), involving issues of laws and may act on the verdicts rendered on the cases in context in which it enjoys jurisdiction. The court is headed by the Chief Justice of Somaliland who is appointed by the President of Somaliland, the current President of the Court is Adan Haji Ali.

See also
 List of Chief Justices of the Supreme Court of Somaliland
 Ministry of Justice (Somaliland)
 Politics of Somaliland

References

1991 establishments in Somaliland
Constitutional courts
Somaliland
Government of Somaliland
Courts and tribunals established in 1991